Prelude, Fugue, and Allegro in E-flat major, BWV 998, is a musical composition written by Johann Sebastian Bach for Lute or Harpsichord. 
The piece was written around 1735. The original manuscript with the title "Prelude pour la Luth. ò Cembal. Par J.S. Bach" was sold at Christie's on July 13, 2016 for £2,518,500.

Structure

Prelude 

The Prelude is similar to the Well-Tempered Clavier (the second book of which dates from around the same time as this work), in which there are many arpeggios. There is a pause in the motion, when just before the coda, there is a fermata over a third-inversion seventh chord with a rich suspension. There is a rare example of explicit consecutive fifths in the left-hand of bar 46.

Fugue 

The Fugue is one of only three that Bach wrote in ternary form, with an exact repetition of its contrapuntally active opening section framing a texturally contrasting central section.

Allegro 

The Allegro is a binary form dance with 16th notes.

Arrangement for guitar
Arranged for guitar, it is usually played in D major with a Drop D tuning. Julian Bream played it in a BBC2 broadcast on television in early 1978 at the All Saints chapel of Wardour Castle. In 1994 he recorded it on his album Bach Guitar Recital.

References

External links 
BWV998

Preludes by Johann Sebastian Bach
Fugues by Johann Sebastian Bach
Compositions for lute
Compositions in E-flat major

it:Partita per liuto o clavicembalo in Mi bemolle maggiore